Joaquín G. Rojas (July 6, 1938 – January 30, 2018) was a Filipino basketball player who played in the Summer Olympics.

Career
Rojas is known for playing in the point guard position. He played for the collegiate squad of the University of the Visayas and was part of the squad that made an upset against Ateneo in the 1957 intercollegiate.

Rojas went on to play at the Manila Industrial and Commercial Athletic Association as he was recruited by Julian Macoy to play for Yutivo in the 1960s but a year later moved to Ysmael Steel Admirals where gained significant reputation. and later with Mariwasa with Narciso Bernardo and Edgardo Roque. He also played for the Toyota Comets during the first two seasons of the Philippine Basketball Association in 1975 and 1976. He helped won titles for Ysmael, and Mariwasa. Rojas also aided Toyota in securing titles during the inaugural 1975 PBA season.

Rojas was part of the Philippines national basketball team from 1965 to 1971. He competed at the 1966 Asian Games which saw the Philippines losing its chance to win a medal after losing to South Korea in the quarterfinal. However Rojas helped the national team secure the 1967 ABC Championship and then competed at the 1968 Summer Olympics. In the 1969 edition of the ABC Championship, the Rojas with the national team lost the title to South Korea settling for bronze.

Death
Rojas died on January 30, 2018. He has been ill for the last few years of his life. Rojas' wake was hosted in Imus, Cebu City.

References

External links
 

1938 births
2018 deaths
Olympic basketball players of the Philippines
Basketball players at the 1968 Summer Olympics
Basketball players at the 1966 Asian Games
Philippines men's national basketball team players
Filipino men's basketball players
Toyota Super Corollas players
Asian Games competitors for the Philippines
Point guards
Basketball players from Southern Leyte